A Natural Man is a 1915 silent film drama short directed by Ulysses Davis and produced by the Vitagraph Company of America. The General Film Company distributed the film.

The film is preserved in the Library of Congress collection.

Cast
Gayne Whitman - Karl Holden (*Alfred Vosburgh)
Myrtle Gonzalez - Rose, Karl's Sweetheart
Otto Lederer - Karl's Father
George Stanley - Rose's Uncle

References

External links
 A Natural Man at IMDb.com

1915 films
American silent short films
American black-and-white films
1915 short films
Vitagraph Studios short films
Silent American drama films
1915 drama films
1910s American films